Pablo Fernando Aurrecochea Medina (born March 3, 1981 in Artigas, Uruguay) is an Uruguayan retired footballer. He was best known for wearing kits adorned with cartoon characters such as Tom and Jerry, Krusty the Clown, The Incredible Hulk, Batman, He-Man, El Chapulín Colorado and others.

Career
Pablo Aurrecochea started his professional football career with Uruguayan football club Nacional, however it wasn't until he moved to Argentina, first with Argentinos Juniors and then Talleres de Remedios de Escalada before he started to establish himself as a first-choice goalkeeper. This would see him move to Paraguayan Primera División side Tacuary and for the next several seasons he would become a regular member of the team until the 2007 league season saw him loaned off to another Paraguayan side in Cerro Porteño. Pablo would return from his loan period and play for Tacuary again in a further 5 league games, however that wasn't enough for him to regain his position within the team and he left to join top tier Colombian side Bucaramanga.

In 2009 Pablo would join another Paraguayan side in Guaraní and was initially tried out in some of the 2009 Copa Libertadores group games. Throughout the league season he would gradually go on to establish himself at the club and by the 2010 Paraguayan Primera División season he was part of the team that won the 2010 Apertura.

Honours
Guaraní
Torneo Apertura (1): 2010

References

External links
 
 
 

1981 births
Living people
People from Artigas, Uruguay
Uruguayan people of Basque descent
Uruguayan footballers
Uruguayan expatriate footballers
Uruguay international footballers
Club Nacional de Football players
Club Guaraní players
Club Tacuary footballers
Cerro Porteño players
Argentinos Juniors footballers
Talleres de Remedios de Escalada footballers
Atlético Bucaramanga footballers
C.D. Antofagasta footballers
Club Atlético Atlanta footballers
Argentino de Merlo footballers
Uruguayan Primera División players
Paraguayan Primera División players
Chilean Primera División players
Argentine Primera División players
Primera B Metropolitana players
Expatriate footballers in Argentina
Expatriate footballers in Chile
Expatriate footballers in Paraguay
Expatriate footballers in Colombia
Association football goalkeepers